Filyayevskaya is a rural locality (a village) in Muravyovskoye Rural Settlement of Velsky District, Arkhangelsk Oblast, Russia. The population was 145 as of 2014. There are 15 streets.

Geography 
Filyayevskaya is located 8 km northeast of Velsk (the district's administrative centre) by road. Petukhovskaya is the nearest rural locality.

References 

Rural localities in Velsky District